Selim Islami (March 18, 1923 - October 26, 2001) was an Albanian archaeologist and historian from Sarandë who contributed to the development of Illyrian studies.

Biography 
Selim Islami was born in Pandalejmon, Sarandë District, Albania. He completed his primary education in Saranda and secondary education in Elbasan. In 1951 he graduated from the Moscow University and returned to Albania, where he worked for around forty years at the Albanian Academy of Sciences as an archaeologist.

He was the director of the Archaeological Museum in Tirana, for over ten years he headed its archaeological department.  He was also vice-dean of the Faculty of History and Philology of the University of Tirana. In 1973 he was awarded the title of professor.

Selected publications 
  Historia e Shqipërisë (History of Albania), 1959, 1967, with Kristo Frashëri, Stefanaq Pollo, Aleks Buda
  Nouvelles données sur l'antiquité illyrienne dans le territoire albanais 1962
  Iliria në mijëvjeçarin e I p.e.s. (Illyria in the 1st millennium BC), 1964 with Hasan Ceka
  Ilirët dhe Iliria te autorët antikë (The Illyrians and Illyria in ancient authors), 1965, with Frano Prendi; Hasan Ceka, Skënder Anamali
  Le Monnayage de Skodra, Lissos et Genthios, 1966
  Historia e popullit shqiptar (History of Albanians), 1969, with Kristo Frashëri, Aleks Buda
  L’ Etat Illyrien, sa place et son role dans le monde mediterraneen, 1972
  L’Epire ancienare (Reflexion sur le probleme ethnique), 1972
  Shteti ilir, vendi dhe roli i tij në botën mesdhetare, 1974
  Epiri antik : vështrim i shkurtër etnologjik, 1984
  Les Illyriens : aperçu historique, 1985, with Skënder Anamali, Muzafer Korkuti, Frano Prendi
  Problems of Illyrian History, 1998
  Historia e ilirëve (History of Illyrians), 2008,  with Mimoza Verzivolli

See also 
 illyrian studies
 Academy of Albanological Studies

References

External links 
 

1923 births
Illyrologists
Albanian archaeologists
2001 deaths
Archaeology of Albania